Maryborough was a constituency represented in the Irish House of Commons until 1800. The town is known as Portlaoise since 1929.

Members of Parliament
 1585 Robert Gale, Thomas Lambyne and George Harvey
 1613–1615 Sir Adam Loftus and Alexander Barrington
 1634–1635 Sir Walter Crosbie, 1st Baronet and Sir William Gilbert
 1639–1649 Sir Nicholas White (died and replaced 1644 by Henry Gilbert) and Sir William Gilbert
 1661–1666 John Gilbert and George St George (sat for Leitrim and replaced 1661 by Alexander Pigott)

1689–1801

Notes

References

Historic constituencies in County Laois
Constituencies of the Parliament of Ireland (pre-1801)
Portlaoise
1800 disestablishments in Ireland
Constituencies disestablished in 1800